Anita Lerche is a singer-songwriter, composer and actress from Denmark. With the release of her album Heer from Denmark in November 2006, she became the first non-Asian woman from the west to create a solo album in Punjabi. In addition to singing in Punjabi, she has sung in a total of 16 different languages.

Early life and education

Lerche was born on 21 December 1973 in Glostrup and grew up in Herlev, which are suburbs of Copenhagen. She grew up in a musical household, with her father Mogens Flemming Lerche singing and playing the guitar. Her great grandfather Knud Peter Emil Nielsen was a professional singer and musician. About her father's influence on her love of music, Anita said, “He was my big inspiration. He has a great voice and was always playing the guitar and singing. I was just listening, and I got inspired by him.”

At the age of seven, Lerche began singing publicly when she joined the Herlev School choir. At the age of 13, she was accepted to the choir of Radio Denmark and was chosen to sing in an opera for children called Lykken og Forstanden. Two years later, she started training in the western classical music style and got her first professional job as a church singer.

After earning her high school diploma from Sankt Annæ Gymnasium in 1992, Lerche enrolled in a  three-year Rytmikpædagog, a rhythm-based music education program. She graduated in 1996.

Lerche studied musical theatre at Mountview Academy of Theatre Arts in London. Prior to Mountview, she also studied piano performance, learning works by Bach and Chopin among other composers. About the experience, she has said, “I always wanted to become a professional. So I wanted to get a very good education. I've had around 16 years of classical singing training. Musical theatre is a great way of expressing oneself, and I got some great tools for acting and dancing as well.” After completing her bachelor's degree in 2001, Anita performed in many musical theatre productions in London and Denmark.

Career

Musical Theatre (2001–05)

In 2001, Lerche performed the duet song "Mit Hjerte Det Banker (My Heart Is Beating)" alongside Simon Munk as a part of Dansk Melodi Grand Prix, the Danish branch of the Eurovision Song Contest. She also sang the American national anthem, The Star-Spangled Banner, at the boxing match between Mike Tyson and Brian Nielsen. Her performance, at Parken Stadium in Copenhagen, was broadcast live worldwide to more than 200 million viewers.

After acting and singing in numerous musical theatre productions, including Sommer i Tyrol (The White Horse Inn) where she played the part of Annelise, Anita released her first solo album, I Love a Piano in 2005. The album includes some of her favorite songs from musical theatre and pop. It also features soft renditions of the American folk song "The House of the Rising Sun" and Eric Clapton's "Tears in Heaven." She also recorded "Tid til Kærlighed (Time For Love)" as a part of the Danish charity telethon DM i indsamling 2005–Forældreløse børn i Afrika.

Voyage in Indian Music (2005–2007)

In addition to being the year Lerche released her debut album, 2005 was also the year her musical career took a major turn. While hiking in the Indian Himalayas on vacation, she fell in love with Punjabi music and culture. Lerche and her friends stayed at an apple orchard owned by Anurag Sood in Parvati Valley, district Kullu, Himachal Pradesh. It was during her trek through Parvati Valley in Himachal Pradesh that she came into contact with Indian tribal music.

Lerche's friend Gunnar Mühlmann, the tour organizer and musician, suggested that she record some of the tribal songs together with the tribal people—as an East-Meet-West-Project. Anurag, the owner of the apple orchard, liked the idea so much that he invited her to his home in Hoshiarpur to record the songs. During the bus ride into Punjab, however, Lerche heard Punjabi music for the very first time as it played over the vehicle's radio. Thinking about that ride, she said, “The music and the rhythms were so inspiring, I wanted to dance there and then in the bus. I felt that this was the music I had been looking for.” She decided to cancel all of her concerts back in Europe to stay in India and learn about Punjabi music and culture.

Over the following three months in Hoshiarpur, Anurag and his family helped Lerche learn to sing in Punjabi. “It was very challenging getting the right pronunciation, and we spend lots of time refining it," she said. "It is very important to me to understand the literal meaning of each word and the full story of the songs I am singing.”

Lerche also received instruction from the late Rattan Singh Rajput, who was one of the driving forces behind her first Punjabi album. Rattan Singh also taught her how to sing in Hindi, including Bollywood songs and the traditional Hindu worship songs called Bhajans. Lerche said that “Rattan Singh Rajput taught and rectified all the pronunciation and meanings of my lyrics and the stories behind my songs.”

In 2006, after months of living in India, learning about the culture, practicing Punjabi and recording music, Lerche finally released her first Punjabi album, Heer from Denmark. Critics lauded the album, describing Lerche as “captivating audiences across India with her unique and electrifying performances. Huge crowds and fans flocked to see her across India when the blonde bombshell hit with her Punjabi rhythms and soundtracks.”

Lerche selected songs for the album from multiple songwriters, including Chann Gorayanwala, who wrote "Passport,"  Satwinder Bhanewala, who wrote "Gori,"  and Jaggi Singh, among others. Lerche also wrote the song "Goddess" for the album. Concerning the album, producer Satvinder Singh said, “With lot of hard work, today we got success.”

Throughout Heer from Denmark, Lerche pays tribute to the rich Punjabi culture. She received special praise for her performance of the traditional song "Heer," which is based on the classic Punjabi tragic romance Heer Ranjha by Waris Shah. The Times of India reported: “Anita has also rendered traditional ‘Heer’ in the album and succeeded in imbuing the depth, pain and passion of the rich composition. ... In fact, going by her style and pronunciation, one would get the impression that she is a Punjabi only to discover that she is white.”

A Figure in Punjabi Music (2007–2013)

In the wake of the publicity that she received for Heer from Denmark, Lerche was given many opportunities to perform in India, which helped make her a prominent figure in Punjabi music. For instance, Lerche created a Hindi song to celebrate the Indian Cricket team during the World Cup in both 2007 and 2011. The cricket songs were set to the tune of Lerche’s hit "Gori," with the words changed to support India's most popular team. Both years, Lerche performed the songs on television multiple times, including one special performance for the team in 2007 live on STAR TV India.

Lerche also continued to record new music. In 2009, she collaborated with the rapper Cheshire Cat to create the song "Maahiya." The track mixes Lerche's Punjabi vocals with Cheshire Cat's reggae rap. "Maahiya" won the World Music Track of the Year 2009 from the Danish Music Awards for its blending of disparate musical traditions. This was special for Lerche, because it was the first time she received a major award from her home country.

In 2010, Lerche collaborated on the track "Aao Ji," along with musicians Yaz Alexander, Kiureli Sammallathi and Skibu. The collaboration was arranged by Bhangra musician and producer King Gurcharan Mall, and the track was backed by his Indian drum group, Dhol Blasters.

Lerche's desire to sing and dance in a Bollywood film was the subject of a 2010 documentary, Fra Herlev til Bollywood. The half-hour documentary, directed by Gry Louise Kolind, follows Lerche's journey to Mumbai as she tried to break into the Bollywood scene. The film was broadcast on DR2, a prominent Danish Broadcast Corporation television station. The film once again allowed Lerche to be recognized in her homeland, and it also allowed the people of Denmark to glimpse the beauty of India. About the documentary and her desire to perform in Bollywood films, Lerche said, “I know if I have the passion, and work hard, I have a chance, because I carry a Bollywood dream in my heart. And I know everything is possible in India!” 

Kolind said that because one of the Danish Broadcasting Corporation stations had been playing Bollywood movies every Saturday, popular interest in the movies had grown. So she wanted to show the people who are in Bollywood, as well as those who wish to get involved in the industry. “And of course, there's the developing story of Anita and her struggles in Bollywood as well. Since Anita is a well-known name in Denmark, and she's done well for herself in Punjab, we wanted to see how far she could go.”

In 2011, Lerche was a featured artist on the recording of a musical drama, The Bollywood Trip. She sang on the tracks "Soniye," along with Vicky Singh and Stephan Grabowski, and "Mahia Ve" with Stephan Grabowski.

Lerche also increased her digital presence in 2011, when she released her own app for Apple and Android products through Mobile Roadie. The app allows fans to interact, watch music videos and learn about Lerche and her music.

In 2012, producer Agiapal Singh Randhawa created a documentary about Lerche's life, achievements and love of Punjabi culture, called Kashish Punjab Di. The documentary was broadcast on India's DD Punjabi.

Sadke Punjab Ton and Current Career (2013–present)

In 2013, Lerche released three singles from her most recent album Sadke Punjab Ton, which was released in October 2014. The Tribune India reported on the album: “Anita Lerche has embodied and furthered Punjabi culture through her music. Her [latest] album ‘Sadke Punjab Ton’ does highlight both her appreciation of Punjabi culture and her evolution as a Punjabi Singer.”

The title track came out in April and "Sammi" in July. For both singles, the music was produced by Gurmoh with lyrics by Dr. Tejinder Harjit. Lerche has said that "Sammi" pays tribute to all of the Indian women who have enriched the Punjabi culture through music and dance. Critics have reported that “Sadke Punjab Ton does highlight her appreciation and growing knowledge of Punjabi culture, but Anita lets her classical training shine in her new single ‘Merea Ranjha.’”

According to Lerche, "Merea Ranjha" was inspired by her personal life as well as her love of the classical folk tale on which the song "Heer" is based. Of the track, she said, “Heer Ranjha, by Waris Shah, has inspired me a lot throughout the years, and on a full-moon night a few years ago, I suddenly felt this profound desire and was longing more than ever to be united with my Ranjha. ‘Merea Ranjha’ came to life at this moment, and later my composition and lyrics were beautifully produced in Denmark by the renowned Nasima Music.”

In December 2013, Lerche performed at a fundraiser for Christel House International, a global children's charity based in Indianapolis, to raise awareness about the organization’s work in India. Concerning the performance, Examiner.com reported: “Indeed, Lerche has one of those truly unique voices; strong, powerful, well-rounded, classically trained, and capable of singing any genre of music and in numerous languages.” The performance was held at the Cook Theater. KP Singh, an artist and Sikh community leader in Indianapolis, expressed his excitement about the performance, writing: “I am familiar with Ms. Lerche's sensational talent and efforts to introduce Sikh sacred music and the robust Punjabi Bhangra music to the Western audiences.”

Lerche performed in additional concerts to benefit Christel House in 2014 and 2015. Both performances received positive reviews in local and international publications.

In 2014, Lerche became a member of the National Academy of Recording Arts and Sciences–Chicago Chapter, after moving to the United States as a permanent resident. "I managed to obtain a Green Card as a unique artist in Punjabi culturally inspired music after two long years, but it was all worth it," she told one news outlet. Lerche continues traveling the globe and spreading Punjabi culture and music.

Lerche's fourth solo album, "Bhajans", was released in 2016 and consists of eight Hindi devotional songs. This is the first full Hindi album from Lerche. The album went straight to #6 on Billboard New Age Chart as a Hot Shot Debut the first week of release  as well as #11 on the Billboard World Music chart  and peaked in October as #5 on Billboard New Age Chart  and #6 on Billboard World Music chart

Personal life 
In 2014, Anita Lerche married Danish-born Soren Hjorth. Ceremonies were held in Denmark, India and the United States. Lerche's latest album, Sadke Punjab Ton, was released at the couple's traditional Punjabi wedding in November 2014. "I am so much in love with Punjabi culture and tradition. . . . I always wanted to have an Indian wedding," Lerche said. The event, held in Hoshiarpur, Punjab, India, was covered on Jagbani TV. The couple's son, Alexander Hjorth Lerche, was born in 2015. When she is not on tour, Lerche resides with her family in Indianapolis.

Humanitarian Work

Lerche has teamed up with many charitable organizations throughout her career. Her desire to help people in need stems from her belief that everyone is connected. At a benefit in Ludhiana, she told local media, “We all have one heart.” Most of her humanitarian work supports organizations that provide children with an education and basic needs, as well as organizations that support those on the fringe of society. Lerche has said, “I deeply feel that we all have an obligation to support the people in need.”

She has performed benefit concerts for Indianapolis-based Christel House International [5] in 2013, 2014, 2015, 2016 and 2017. These benefit concerts support education in India, Mexico, South Africa and the U.S. where students face many challenges. The 2017 Christel House Concert was a major success and to date, the concerts have raised over $536,000 for the charity.

Lerche has also partnered with Little Big Help, which assists impoverished children in the slums of Calcutta. The organization helps children “secure their basic human rights such as education, basic medical care, shelter and nutrition every day.” In late 2010, Lerche performed for a fundraiser in Copenhagen. and followed up with a second performance at the 2016 fundraiser  Through song and dance, she helped bring some Punjabi flare to the India-themed charity events.

Lerche has also helped Pingalwara, a home for the disabled and disenfranchised in Amritsar, Punjab (India). Lerche even performed a Punjabi children's song, entitled “Kanna Manna Kurrr,” for the residents during a recent visit. In 2016 Lerche was picked to be one of the artists featured on the album Music To Inspire against Human Trafficking initiated by Rukus Avenue and the UN, Blue Heart Campaign.

She often donates her voice, performing at concerts or releasing tracks for charity. Even before her switch to Indian music, she participated in DM i indsamling 2005–Forældreløse børn i Afrika, a 24-hour Danish telethon that raised money for African orphans. The track "Tid til Kærlighed (Time For Love)," which features Lerche and four other prominent Danish vocalists, was recorded and released as a part of this program.

Awards and honors

Discography

Soundtracks

Voice Acting (Dubbing into Danish)

As well as Lerche's experience in musical theatre and the recording world, she has worked as a voice actor for Disney, Pixar and a Barbie books series. While she was working as a freelancer, Lerche took many classes on singing, dancing and acting, including a short class on dubbing. Soon she was recruited by Danish actor and producer Lars Thiesgaard to dub a Barbie books series into Danish. Later, they both appeared in the second and third Toy Story movies as well as Planes.

References

External links

 Anita Lerche Official site
 Anita Lerche Facebook
 Anita Lerche Twitter
 Anita Lerche Instagram
 Anita Lerche YouTube
 Anita Lerche Vimeo

Danish women singer-songwriters
Punjabi music
Punjabi-language singers
Living people
1973 births
21st-century Danish women singers
Danish composers
People from Glostrup Municipality
Danish expatriates in India
Singers from Copenhagen